Louis Auguste Léodar Couvrechef (1827–1858) was a French architect who served Napoleon III as architect for the imperial residences.

Early life
Louis Auguste Léodar Couvrechef was born in Mathieu, Calvados, in 1827.

Education
He studied at the École des Beaux-Arts in Paris.

Career
Couvrechef was made a sub-inspector under architect Hippolyte Durand on the project to build the Villa Eugénie in Biarritz as a summer residence for the imperial family,
starting in 1854. Durand chose a rather austere design, and was abruptly dismissed in June 1855.
Couvrechef, who was known to prefer a more decorative style, was given responsibility for continuing the work.

In 1857 Couvrechef became architect of the Château de Pau. 
Couvrechef was also involved in reconstruction of the Empress's Castillo de Arteaga in the province of Biscay in Spain, 
a medieval building surrounded by walls with four round towers.

Death
Couvrechef died in 1858 and was replaced as architect of the imperial residences by Gabriel-Auguste Ancelet.

References

Sources

1827 births
1858 deaths
19th-century French architects